Sher Khan or Shir Khan is a border town in the northern Kunduz Province of Afghanistan, next to the Panj River. The town's main attraction is the Sher Khan Bandar, which is a dry port and border checkpoint that officially connects by road Afghanistan with neighboring Tajikistan. The historical name of the town was Qizil Qalah. It was given the current name in honor of Sher Khan Nashir, Khan of the Nashers. The town has around 600 families.

It is a major transporting, shipping and receiving location. It has various facilities of different sizes, including Afghan government offices. Security in and around the town is provided by the Afghan National Security Forces. Every traveler between Afghanistan and Tajikistan is required to possess a valid travel visa.

Sher Khan began to grow after the completion of the Tajik–Afghan bridge at Panji Poyon in 2007. Its southern end is the official port of entry into Afghanistan. The bridge and the easy connectivity with Tajikistan boosted trade between Afghanistan and Central Asia. It has been reported in the past that as many as 400 shipping trucks passed through the town every day, carrying trade goods from one country to the other. This trade has also made many local shop owners wealthy. In November 2012, Afghan officials announced that they plan to build about 2,000 new residential houses, 41 business plazas including offices, shops and stores.

See also 
Afghanistan–Tajikistan border
Afghanistan–Tajikistan relations
Land border crossings of Afghanistan

References

External links

 
 

Afghanistan–Tajikistan border crossings
Populated places in Kunduz Province